Summer of '42 is a 1971 American coming-of-age film based on the memoirs of screenwriter Herman "Hermie" Raucher. It tells the story of how Raucher, in his early teens on his 1942 summer vacation on Nantucket Island (off the coast of Cape Cod), embarks on a one-sided romance with a young woman, Dorothy, whose husband has gone off to fight in World War II.

The film was directed by Robert Mulligan, and starred Gary Grimes as Hermie, Jerry Houser as his best friend Oscy, Oliver Conant as their nerdy young friend Benjie, and Jennifer O'Neill, as the mysterious woman with whom Hermie becomes involved. In supporting roles, Katherine Allentuck and Christopher Norris are a pair of girls whom Hermie and Oscy attempt to seduce. Mulligan also has an uncredited narrator role, as the voice of the adult Hermie. Maureen Stapleton (Allentuck's mother) also appears in a small, uncredited voice role.

Raucher's novelization of his screenplay of the same name was released prior to the film's release and became a runaway bestseller, to the point that audiences lost sight of the fact that the book was based on the film and not vice versa. Though a pop culture phenomenon in the first half of the 1970s, the novelization went out of print and slipped into obscurity throughout the next two decades until a Broadway adaptation in 2001 brought it back into the public light and prompted Barnes & Noble to acquire the publishing rights to the book. The film was followed by a sequel, Class of '44, also written by Raucher, with lead actors Grimes, Houser, and Conant reprising their roles.

Plot

The film opens with a series of still photographs appearing over melancholic music, representing the abstract memories of the unseen Herman Raucher, now a middle-aged man. Raucher recalls the summer he spent on Nantucket island in 1942. The film flashes back to a day that then-15-year-old "Hermie" and his friends – jock Oscy and introverted nerd Benjie – spent playing on the beach. They spot a young soldier carrying his new bride into a house on the beach, and are struck by her beauty, especially Hermie, who is unable to get her out of his mind.

They continue spending afternoons on the beach where, in the midst of scantily-clad teenage girls, their thoughts invariably turn to sex. All of them are virgins: Oscy is obsessed with the act of sex, while Hermie finds himself developing romantic interest in the bride, whose husband he spots leaving the island on a water taxi one morning. Later that day, Hermie sees her outside the local market struggling with grocery bags that she subsequently drops and comes to her aid and offers to carry the bags home for her, which she gladly accepts, and in this way gets to meet her.

Meanwhile, Oscy and Hermie, thanks to an illustrated sex manual discovered by Benjie, become convinced they know everything necessary to lose their virginity. Led by Oscy, they test this by going to the cinema and picking up a trio of high-school girls. Oscy stakes out the most attractive one, Miriam, "giving" Hermie her less attractive friend, Aggie, and leaving Benjie with Gloria, a heavyset girl with dental braces. Frightened by the immediacy of sex, Benjie runs off, and is not seen by Hermie or Oscy again that night. Initially, the two girls who were with Hermie and Oscy say they will not go in without Benjie's would-be date, but she tells them to go without her, then leaves herself. While they are waiting in the ticket line for the movie, the young war bride appears and greets Hermie and asks him if he can help her move some boxes the next day. The remainder of the evening is devoted to attempting to "put the moves" on Miriam and Aggie while they watch the film. Oscy pursues Miriam, eventually making out with her during the movie, and later learns her ways are well-known on the island. Hermie finds himself succeeding with Aggie, who allows him to grope what he thinks is her breast; Oscy later points out Hermie was fondling her arm.

The next morning, Hermie helps the bride move boxes into her attic, her bare thigh at one point passing by his face on a ladder, and she thanks him by giving him a kiss on the forehead. Later, in preparation for a marshmallow roast on the beach with Aggie and Miriam, Hermie goes to the local drugstore, and in an amusingly embarrassing sequence, builds up the nerve to ask the druggist (Lou Frizzell) for condoms (or "rubbers," as they were known in the '40s). That night, Hermie roasts marshmallows with Aggie while Oscy succeeds in having sex with Miriam between the dunes. He is so successful, he sneaks over to Hermie and Aggie to ask for more condoms. Confused as to what is happening, Aggie follows Oscy back, where she sees him having sex with Miriam and runs home, upset.

The next day, Hermie comes across the bride sitting outside her house, writing to her husband. Hermie offers to keep her company that night, and she says she looks forward to seeing him, revealing her name is Dorothy. An elated Hermie goes home and puts on a suit, dress shirt, and dress shoes, and heads back to Dorothy's house, running into Oscy on the way; Oscy relates that Miriam's appendix burst, and she has been rushed to the mainland. Hermie, convinced he is at the brink of adulthood because of his relationship with Dorothy, brushes Oscy off.

He heads to her house, which is eerily quiet. Going in, he discovers a bottle of whiskey, a record player spinning at the end of a record, several cigarette butts, and a telegram from the government. Dorothy's husband is dead, his plane shot down over France. Dorothy comes out of her bedroom, crying, and Hermie tells her, "I'm sorry." She turns on the record player and invites Hermie to dance with her. They kiss and embrace, tears on both their faces. Without speaking, they move to the bedroom, where she draws him into bed and gently makes love with him. Afterward, withdrawing again, Dorothy retires to the porch, leaving Hermie alone in her bedroom. He approaches her on the porch, where she can only quietly say "Good night, Hermie." He leaves, his last image of Dorothy being of her leaning against the railing, as she smokes a cigarette and stares into the night sky.

At dawn, Hermie meets Oscy and the two share a moment of reconciliation, with Oscy informing Hermie that Miriam will recover. Oscy, in an uncharacteristic act of sensitivity, lets Hermie be by himself, departing with the words, "Sometimes life is one big pain in the ass."

Trying to sort out what has happened, Hermie goes back to Dorothy's house. Dorothy has fled the island in the night, and an envelope is in the front door with Hermie's name on it. Inside is a note from Dorothy, saying she hopes he understands she must go back home as there is much to do. She assures Hermie she will never forget him, and he will find his way of remembering what happened that night. Her note closes with the hope that Hermie may be spared the senseless tragedies of life.

In one of the final scenes, Hermie, suddenly approaching adulthood, is seen looking at Dorothy's old house and the ocean from a distance before he runs to catch up with his friends. The adult Raucher sadly recounts that he has never seen Dorothy again, nor has he learned what became of her.

Raucher's narration continues with the notion that kids were different back then, and it took longer for them to figure out how they feel. The audience learns Hermie has rejoined his friends with a rundown of the summer's statistics: they raided the Coast Guard station four times, saw five movies, and had nine days of rain. Raucher concludes with, "Benjie broke his watch, Oscy gave up the harmonica, and in a very special way, I lost Hermie. Forever."

Cast
 Jennifer O'Neill as Dorothy
 Gary Grimes as Hermie 
 Jerry Houser as Oscy
 Oliver Conant as Benjie
 Katherine Allentuck as Aggie
 Christopher Norris as Miriam
 Lou Frizzell as druggist

Director Robert Mulligan provides uncredited voiceover narration as the older Hermie. Maureen Stapleton has an uncredited cameo as Sophie, Hermie's mother, and film stuntman Walter Scott appears uncredited as Dorothy's husband.

Production
Herman Raucher wrote the film script in the 1950s during his tenure as a television writer, but "couldn't give it away." In the 1960s, he met Robert Mulligan, best known for directing To Kill a Mockingbird. Raucher showed Mulligan the script, and Mulligan took it to Warner Bros., where Mulligan argued the film could be shot for the relatively low price of $1 million, and Warner approved it. They had so little faith in the film becoming a box-office success, though, they shied from paying Raucher outright for the script, instead promising him ten percent of the gross.

When casting for the role of Dorothy, Warner Bros. declined to audition any actresses younger than the age of 30; Jennifer O'Neill's agent, who had developed a fondness for the script, convinced the studio to audition his client, who was only 22 at the time. O'Neill auditioned for the role, albeit hesitantly, not wanting to perform any nude scenes. O'Neill got the role and Mulligan agreed to find a way to make the film work without blatant nudity.

Nantucket Island was too far modernized in 1970 to be convincingly transformed to resemble an early 1940s resort, so the production location selected was the town of Bar Harbor, Maine. Shooting took place over eight weeks, during which O'Neill was sequestered from the three boys cast as "The Terrible Trio," in order to ensure that they did not become close and ruin the sense of awkwardness and distance that their characters felt towards Dorothy. Production ran smoothly, finishing on schedule.

After production, Warner Bros., still wary about the film only being a minor success, asked Raucher to adapt his script into a book. Raucher wrote it in three weeks, and Warner Bros. released it prior to the film to build interest in the story. The book quickly became a national bestseller, so that when trailers premiered in theaters, the film was billed as being "based on the national bestseller," despite the film having been completed first. Ultimately, the book became one of the best-selling novels of the first half of the 1970s, requiring 23 reprints between 1971 and 1974 to keep up with customer demand.

Factual basis
The film (and subsequent novel) were memoirs written by Herman Raucher; they detailed the events in his life over the course of the summer he spent on Nantucket Island in 1942 when he was fourteen years old. Originally, the film was meant to be a tribute to his friend Oscar "Oscy" Seltzer, an Army medic killed in the Korean War. Seltzer was shot dead on a battlefield in Korea while tending to a wounded man; this happened on Raucher's birthday, and consequently, Raucher has not celebrated a birthday since. While writing the screenplay, Raucher realized that despite growing up with Oscy and having bonded with him through their formative years, the two had never really had any meaningful conversations or known one another on a more personal level.

Instead, Raucher decided to focus on the first major adult experience of his life, that of falling in love for the first time. The woman (named Dorothy, like her screen counterpart) was a fellow vacationer on the island whom the 14-year-old Raucher had befriended one day when he helped her carry groceries home; he became a friend of her and her husband and helped her with chores after her husband was called to fight in World War II. On the night memorialized in the film, Raucher randomly came to visit her, unaware his arrival was just minutes after she received notification of her husband's death. She was confused and upset, had been drinking heavily, and repeatedly called Raucher by her husband's name. Although both ultimately disrobed, contrary to popular perception, sexual intercourse did not occur. Raucher admitted this in a 2002 interview, saying it was mostly holding, but in the movie "We let you think what you want."

The next morning, Raucher discovered that she had left the island, leaving behind a note for him (which is read at the end of the film and reproduced in the book). He never saw her again; his last "encounter" with her, recounted on an episode of The Mike Douglas Show, came after the film's release in 1971, when she was one of over a dozen women who wrote letters to Raucher claiming to be "his" Dorothy. Raucher recognized the "real" Dorothy's handwriting, and she confirmed her identity by making references to certain events only she could have known about. She told Raucher that she had lived for years with the guilt that she had potentially traumatized him and ruined his life. She told Raucher that she was glad he turned out all right, and that they had best not re-visit the past.

In a 2002 Scripps Treasure Coast Publishing interview, Raucher lamented never hearing from her again and expressed his hope that she was still alive. Raucher's novelization of the screenplay, with the dedication, "To those I love, past and present," serves more as the tribute to Seltzer that he had intended the film to be, with the focus of the book being more on the two boys' relationship than Raucher's relationship with Dorothy. Consequently, the book also mentions Seltzer's death, which is absent from the film adaptation.

A glaring error in both the book and movie centers around the movie Now, Voyager. They go to a movie theater to see the movie in the "summer of '42". Factually, however, the film was released nationally in the U.S. on October 31, 1942, with an October 22 premiere in New York City, so it would have been impossible to see the movie that summer.

Reception and awards
The film became a blockbuster upon its release, grossing over $32 million, making one of the most successful films of 1971, with an expense-to-profit ratio of 1:32; beyond that, it is estimated video rentals and purchases in the United States since the 1980s have produced an additional $20.5 million. On this point, Raucher said in May 2002 that his ten percent of the gross, in addition to royalties from book sales, "has paid bills ever since."

Summer of '42 received positive reviews. The review aggregator website Rotten Tomatoes reported a 79% approval rating based on 24 reviews, with an average rating of 6.73/10. It went on to be nominated for over a dozen awards, including Golden Globe Awards for "Best Motion Picture – Drama" and "Best Director", and four Academy Award nominations for Best Original Music Score, Best Cinematography, Best Editing, Best Original Screenplay. Ultimately, the film won two awards: the Academy Award for Best Original Score, and the 1971 BAFTA Award for Best Original Music, both to Michel Legrand.

Sequel
In 1973, the film was followed by Class of '44, a slice-of-life film made up of vignettes about Herman Raucher and Oscar Seltzer's experiences in college. Class of '44 involves the boys facing army service in the last year of World War II. The only crew member from Summer of '42 to return to the project was Raucher himself, who wrote the script; a new director and composer were brought in to replace Mulligan and Legrand. Of the principal four cast members of Summer of '42, only Jerry Houser and Gary Grimes returned for prominent roles, with Oliver Conant making two brief appearances totaling less than two minutes of screen time. Jennifer O'Neill did not appear in the film at all, nor was the character of Dorothy mentioned.

The film met with poor critical reviews; the only three reviews available at Rotten Tomatoes are resoundingly negative, with Channel 4 calling it "a big disappointment," and The New York Times stating "The only things worth attention in 'Class of '44' are the period details," and "'Class of '44' seems less like a movie than 95 minutes of animated wallpaper."

Soundtrack

The film's soundtrack consists almost entirely of compositions by Michel Legrand, many of which are variants upon "The Summer Knows", the film's theme.  Lyrics are by Marilyn and Alan Bergman.  Because the complete score runs just under 17 minutes, only the first and eighth tracks on the album are from Summer of '42; the rest of the music is taken from Legrand's score for 1969's The Picasso Summer.

Main theme "Summer of '42" won a Grammy Award at 14th edition held in 1972 for ¨"Best Instrumental Composition".

In addition to Legrand's scoring, the film also features the song "Hold Tight" by The Andrews Sisters and the theme from Now, Voyager.  On the Billboard 200, it debuted on November 9, 1971 and peaked at #52 on November 20, 1971.

In 2014 Intrada Records released Summer of '42 and The Picasso Summer on a limited-edition two-disc set, with the entire score for the former and the original album presentation of the latter (dubbed "The Picasso Suite") on disc 1, and the complete score for The Picasso Summer on disc 2.

Warner Bros. Publications released a sheet music folio, Summer of '42 & Other Hits of the Forties, which contains the movie theme and 34 other unrelated songs.

Cultural impact

Music

Legrand's theme song for the film, "The Summer Knows", has since become a pop standard, being recorded by such artists as Peter Nero (who had a charting hit with his 1971 version), Biddu (1975 international chart hit), Tony Bennett, Frank Sinatra, Sarah Vaughan, Andy Williams, Jonny Fair, Scott Walker, Elis Regina, Jackie Evancho, Oscar Peterson, Bill Evans, Toots Thielemans, George Benson, Roger Williams, and Barbra Streisand.

The 1973 song "Summer (The First Time)" by Bobby Goldsboro has almost exactly the same subject and apparent setting, although there is no direct credited link. Bryan Adams has, however, credited the film as being a partial inspiration for his 1985 hit "Summer of '69".

Garth Brooks' 1993 hit "That Summer" features a similar story of a coming-of-age male in a romance with an older female.

Chart history

Roger Williams

Peter Nero

Biddu Orchestra

Film and television
An episode of the 1970s sitcom Happy Days was loosely based upon Summer of '42, with Richie Cunningham befriending a Korean War widow.

In Stanley Kubrick's 1980 film The Shining, Wendy (Shelley Duvall) is shown watching Summer of '42 on a television.

The film's title formed the basis of a Season 7 episode of The Simpsons, "Summer of 4 Ft. 2".

In the Family Guy episode "Play It Again, Brian" Brian says he plagiarized part of an essay where he discusses his love for Lois from Summer of '42.

The episode "Summer of '85" in Baywatch shows Eddie (Billy Warlock) having a summer romance with an older woman called Lorna when he was a teenager.

Remakes
In the years since the film's release, Warner Bros. has attempted to buy back Raucher's ten percent of the film as well as his rights to the story so it could be remade; Raucher has consistently declined. The 1988 film Stealing Home has numerous similarities to both Summer of '42 and Class of '44, with several incidents (most notably a subplot dealing with the premature death of the protagonist's father and the protagonist's response to it) appearing to have been directly lifted from Raucher's own life; Jennifer O'Neill stated in 2002 she believes "Home" was an attempted remake of "Summer".

Off-Broadway musical
In 2001, Raucher consented to the film being made into an off Broadway musical play. He was on hand opening night, giving the cast a pep-talk which he concluded, "We've now done it every possible way – except go out and piss it in the snow!" The play met with positive critical and fan response, and was endorsed by Raucher himself, but the play was forced to close down in the aftermath of the September 11 attacks. Nevertheless, the play was enough to spark interest in the film and book with a new generation, prompting Warner to re-issue the book (which had since gone out of print, along with all of Raucher's other works) for sale with Barnes & Noble's online bookstore, and to restore the film and release it on DVD. The musical has since been performed across the country, at venues such as Kalliope Stage in Cleveland Heights, Ohio in 2004 (directed by Paul Gurgol) and Mill Mountain Theatre in Roanoke, Virginia, (directed by Jere Hodgin and choreographed by Bernard Monroe), and was subsequently recorded as a concert by the York Theatre Company in 2006.

Alternative sequel
In 2002, O'Neill claimed to have obtained the rights to make a sequel to Summer of '42, based on a short story she wrote, which took place in an alternate reality where Herman Raucher had a son and divorced his wife, went back to Nantucket in 1962 with a still-living Oscar Seltzer, encountered Dorothy again and married her. As of 2017, this project – which O'Neill had hoped to produce with Lifetime television – has not been realized, and it is unknown whether O'Neill is still attempting to get it produced, or if Raucher consented to its production.

See also
 List of American films of 1971

References

External links

Summer of '42 at TV Guide (heavily edited and shorted version of the lengthy 1987 write-up originally published in The Motion Picture Guide)
Summer of '42 by Andy Williamson – The Wordslinger dated April 14, 2008
 

1970s coming-of-age comedy-drama films
1971 films
American biographical films
American coming-of-age comedy-drama films
1970s English-language films
Films about vacationing
Films about virginity
Films about puberty
Films directed by Robert Mulligan
Films scored by Michel Legrand
Films set in 1942
Films set in Nantucket
Films set on beaches
Films set on the home front during World War II
Films that won the Best Original Score Academy Award
Films with screenplays by Herman Raucher
Warner Bros. films
1971 comedy films
1971 drama films
1970s American films